Bad Move is a British television sitcom written by Jack Dee and Pete Sinclair, that premiered on ITV on 20 September 2017. The series stars Dee and Kerry Godliman as Steve and Nicky Rawlings, a middle-aged married couple who escape city life in Leeds by relocating to the countryside. They encounter many problems and soon regret their move.

On 7 November 2017, the show was recommissioned for a second series. It began airing on 19 September 2018. On 5 February 2019, it was announced that the series had been axed by ITV, after 2 series. However ITV bosses revealed later in February that this series, and Birds of a Feather, had not in fact been axed and the announcement was a misunderstanding.

Plot
Steve and Nicky are both on their second marriages and have decided that moving to the Yorkshire countryside from Leeds is the perfect setting for them. They've watched all the TV relocation shows and read the glossy lifestyle magazines and fell in love with the idea of 'getting away from the rat race'.

Living a quiet existence in rural surroundings is a big disappointment for Steve and Nicky. They soon find living in the countryside much worse than they anticipated. They discover that the house which they have bought is in a bad condition and they have great difficulty in having it renovated. It is situated in what locals refer to as 'The Dip' - a place where internet signals cannot reach, but floodwater can. They are disappointed with their small village's lack of amenities, as well as the hostile and unhelpful shopkeeper. The couple dislike their neighbours, who include annoying couple Matt and Meena as well as eccentric rock musician Grizzo.

Cast
Jack Dee as Steve Rawlings
Kerry Godliman as Nicky Rawlings
Sue Vincent as Shannon
Miles Jupp as Matt
Manjinder Virk as Meena
Seann Walsh as Grizzo
Philip Jackson as Ken

Filming 
Location filming took place within the North York Moors National Park in spring 2017. Although seemingly part of the same village, scenes were shot at different places that are in fact several miles apart.

The Rawlings' new home is near Low Mill in Farndale. Abbey Stores in Rosedale Abbey was temporarily converted to the Garthdale Minimarket and much of episode two was filmed in Fadmoor. Episode four featured the White Horse Farm Inn in Rosedale Abbey.

Other filming locations included West London Film Studios.

Episodes

Series 1 (2017)

Series 2 (2018)

Reception 
The first series achieved a 22% audience share on ITV and averaged four million viewers per episode.

References

External links
 
 

2017 British television series debuts
2018 British television series endings
2010s British sitcoms
English-language television shows
ITV sitcoms
Television series about marriage
Television shows set in Yorkshire